Muncef Ouardi (born April 17, 1986 in Quebec City, Quebec) is a Canadian speed skater of Moroccan descent. He competed for Canada at the 2014 Winter Olympics in the 500 m.

References

1986 births
Living people
Canadian male speed skaters
Speed skaters at the 2014 Winter Olympics
Olympic speed skaters of Canada
Speed skaters from Quebec City
Canadian people of Moroccan descent
21st-century Canadian people